Mennen Torres Polintan (born July 8, 1969), known as Gardo Verzosa, is a Filipino actor and comedian.

Career
Polintan started out in roles such as Sabik Sa Halik, Machete II, Halimuyak Ng Babae and Kirot. He was known as "NINO ESPEDILLA". Later, he went on to star in action movies such as Cesar Climaco, Mison, and Ka Hector. He has also appeared in critically acclaimed movies such as the 1998 Marilou Diaz-Abaya version of Rizal where he played the role of hero Andres Bonifacio and Sisa where he played the role of Jose Rizal / Pepe. He also starred in Pinoy Blonde, and some of the highest rated shows in Philippine television including Mula sa Puso where he portrayed Domingo, It Might Be You as Camilo San Carlos and Sugo where he was Apo Abukay.

Versoza has made guest appearances in various shows in both ABS-CBN and GMA - 7. He also appeared in Bubble Gang, Maalaala Mo Kaya, Hokus Pokus, and Magpakailanman.

In early 2016, he began taking the moniker, "Cupcake", which was given by his best friend, Aiai Delas Alas.

In 2019, Gardo Versoza played policeman Ulysses Balthazar on Sandugo and the villainous drug-dealer Lazaro Enriquez on FPJ's Ang Probinsyano. Both shows were aired on ABS-CBN.

Personal life
Gardo married to his  girlfriend Ivy Vicencio. The two have a son named Deity Uziel.

Filmography

Online series

Television

Film
 Ayuda Babes (2021) as Kapitana
 Wander Bra (2018) as Amado
 The Prenup (2015) as Agaton Cayabyab
 Hustisya (2014)
 Sundalong Kanin (2014)
 Sisterakas (2012) as husband of Bernadette - Gardo's 1st VIVA Films Movie
 Bwakaw (2012)
 MNL 143 (2012)
 Astig (2009)
 Prinsipe Sabong (2009)
 Gulong (2007)
 The Bicycle (2007)
 First Day High (2006) as Rene Samartino
 Pinoy Blonde (2005)
 Mano Po III: My Love (2004)
 Woman of Breakwater (2004) as Dave
 Animal (2004) as Ferdie
 Kerida (2003)
 Bigay Hilig (2003)
 Kiskisan (2003) as Marvin
 Biyahera (2002)
 Kailangan Kita (2002)
 Aagos ang Dugo (2001)
 Huwag Mong Ubusin ang Bait Ko! (2000) as Franco Valero
 Sa Piling ng Mga Aswang (1999)
 Sindak (1999)
 Ang Kabit ni Mrs. Montero (1999)
 Sisa (1999) .... José Rizal a.k.a. Pepe
 Mula sa Puso: The Movie as Domingo (cameo)
 Jose Rizal (1998) .... Andrés Bonifacio
 Notoryus (1998) .... SPO1 Dalisay (as Police Syndicate)
 Kargado (1998) .... Frido
 Bawal (1998)
 Kid Manalo: Akin ang Ulo Mo! (1998)
 Ang Lalaki sa Buhay ni Selya (1997) .... Bobby
 The Mariano Mison Story (1997) .... Dennis
 Mabango (1997)
 Kristo (1996) .... Gestas
 Medrano (1996) .... David Medrano
 Halimuyak ng Babae (1996)
 Sabik sa Halik (1995) .... Rico
 Kirot 2 (1995) .... Dino
 'Kandugan (1995)
 Ka Hector (1995)
 Sana'y Laging Magkapiling (1994)
 Machete 2: Pure Awesomeness (1994) .... David
 Bawal na Gamot (1994) .... Jimbo
 Isang Linggong Pag-Ibig (1993)
 Ayaw Ko ng Nangarap (1993) .... Edward
 Kumusta Ka Aking Mahal (1993)
 Isang Linggong Pag-Ibig (1993)
 Taong Gubat (1993)
 Nang Gabing Mamulat si Eba (Jennifer Segovia Story) (1992)
 Stella Magtangol (1992)
 Paminsan-minsan (1992)
 Sana Kahit Minsan (1992) as Tony
 Lumayo Ka Man sa Akin (1992)
 Ilalaban Kita ng Patayan (1991) as Val Saldivia
 Zaldong Tisoy (1991)
 Ubos Na ang Luha Ko (1991) as Nando
 Magdalena S. Palacol Story (1991)
 Onyong Majikero (1991) as George

References

External links
 

1969 births
Living people
20th-century Filipino male actors
21st-century Filipino male actors
ABS-CBN personalities
Arellano University alumni
Filipino male comedians
Filipino male film actors
Filipino male child actors
Filipino male television actors
Filipino people of Indian descent
GMA Network personalities
TV5 (Philippine TV network) personalities